

Fossils
 The famed Georges Cuvier publishes illustrations of vertebrae discovered near Honfleur. He mistakenly describes them as crocodilian, although later researchers have concluded that these remains almost certainly belonged to a theropod dinosaur.

References

1800s in paleontology
Paleontology